John Capaldi (born 16 November 1959) is a Scottish former footballer who played for Aston Villa, Motherwell and Pors Grenland, and also had a spell managing Bolehall Swifts. During his career, he played as a striker.

References

External links
John Capaldi profile at astonvillaplayerdatabase.com

Living people
Footballers from North Lanarkshire
Scottish footballers
Association football forwards
Aston Villa F.C. players
Motherwell F.C. players
Pors Grenland players
Bolehall Swifts F.C. players
Scottish football managers
Bolehall Swifts F.C. managers
English Football League players
1959 births
Expatriate footballers in Norway
People from Newarthill